Gladys María Gutiérrez Alvarado (born 16 April 1962) was the head of the Venezuelan Supreme Court from May 2013 until February 2017.

Career and education 
Gutierrez studied law at the Universidad Central de Venezuela. She became member of the Constitutional Court on 9 December 2010.

She was a member of the Fifth Republic Movement, a party that supported Hugo Chávez. She ran for governor of Nueva Esparta as a member of that party in 1998 but lost.

In 2003 the central government named Gutiérrez ambassador to Spain. She was also general consul of Venezuela in Spain and director of the Office for the Ministers' Council.

From 2006 until 2011, she performed as Head Public Prosecutor of the Republic for former President Hugo Chávez.

Gutiérrez has taught law at the Universidad Santiago Mariño and the Instituto Universitario de Tecnología Rodolfo Loero Arismendi.

Gutiérrez became president of the Supreme Court in May 2013. Her election was contested by the opposition.

Work as head of Supreme Court 
In August 2013 she led the court that dismissed Henrique Capriles' election appeal. Capriles had claimed the audit was a fake and did not correspond with the audit of actual ballots.

Gutiérrez presided the trial that sentenced mayor Vicencio Scarano Spisso to 10.5 months in jail for insubordination.

Sanctions 
Gutiérrez has been sanctioned by several countries.

The U.S. Treasury Department sanctioned Gutiérrez and seven members of the Venezuelan Supreme Justice Tribunal (TSJ) in May 2017 for usurping the functions of the Venezuelan National Assembly and permitting Maduro to govern by decree. The U.S. assets of the eight individuals were frozen, and U.S. persons prohibited from doing business with them.

Canada sanctioned 40 Venezuelan officials, including Gutiérrez, in September 2017. The sanctions were for behaviors that undermined democracy after at least 125 people were killed in the 2017 Venezuelan protests and "in response to the government of Venezuela's deepening descent into dictatorship".  Canadians were banned from transactions with the 40 individuals, whose Canadian assets were frozen.

On 29 March 2018, Gutiérrez was sanctioned by the Panamanian government for his alleged involvement with "money laundering, financing of terrorism and financing the proliferation of weapons of mass destruction".

References 

Venezuelan women judges
Living people
1962 births
Place of birth missing (living people)
Central University of Venezuela alumni
Women chief justices
People of the Crisis in Venezuela
Supreme Tribunal of Justice (Venezuela)
Fifth Republic Movement politicians
United Socialist Party of Venezuela politicians
Women diplomats
Ambassadors of Venezuela to Spain